Halvor Løvold (14 May 1875–20 Oct 1950) was a Norwegian naval officer and politician.

He was born in Øyestad to merchant Thomas Løvold and Birgithe Jensen. From 1907 to 1945 he was appointed managing director in Arendals Dampskibsselskab. He was elected representative to the Storting for the periods 1916–1918 and 1931–1933, for the Conservative Party. He was decorated Knight, First Class of the Order of St. Olav in 1932.

References

1875 births
1950 deaths
People from Arendal
Royal Norwegian Navy personnel
Conservative Party (Norway) politicians
Members of the Storting